Garhi Afghanan is a village (union council Garhi Afghanan) of Taxilla tehsil in Rawalpindi District. It is situated beside Wah Cantt, about 33 km northwest of Islamabad. Its area is about 1.4 square kilometres. It has a population of about 11,000.

History

In the 18th century, during the leadership of Taj Muhammad Khan, Afghans migrated there. The settlement expanded and was named Garhi Afghanan.

Culture

Originally, Afghan dress was common but most locals now dress in shalwar kameez, however, signs of Afghan culture persist.

Language

Pashto was spoken during the founding of the village, but the presence of Hindko speakers popularized the Hindko language, currently common language. Pashto speakers are still found there.

Economy

The population has various jobs in factories, industries, agriculture and dairy farming. Nearby, an ordnance factory, a manufacturing complex and Hattar provide jobs.

Agriculture

The land of Garhi Afghanan is very fertile. Water for cultivation is obtained from tube wells and a canal channeled from Khanpur dam.

Religion

Islam is the dominant religion.

Education

A government school educates for boys and girls. Private schools and colleges also operate.

References

Villages in Rawalpindi District